Luther is a small lunar impact crater on the northwest part of Mare Serenitatis, at the inlet to Lacus Somniorum. To the east-southeast is the large crater Posidonius. Luther has a circular rim and is cup-shaped, with no appreciable wear from impact erosion. It lies across a wrinkle ridge on the lunar mare.

The crater is named after German astronomer Robert Luther.

Satellite craters

By convention these features are identified on lunar maps by placing the letter on the side of the crater midpoint that is closest to Luther.

References

 
 
 
 
 
 
 
 
 
 
 

Impact craters on the Moon
Mare Serenitatis